Rafael Pérez may refer to:

Rafael Pérez (athlete) (born 1946), Costa Rican Olympic runner
Rafael Pérez (baseball) (born 1982), Dominican left-handed professional baseball relief pitcher
Rafael Pérez (politician) (1836–1897), acting President of Ecuador
Rafael Pérez (police officer) (born 1967), central figure in the LAPD Rampart Scandal